The Eighty-seventh Texas Legislature was a meeting of the legislative branch of the U.S. state of Texas, composed of the Texas Senate and the Texas House of Representatives. The Texas State Legislature met in Austin, Texas, from January 12, 2021, to May 31, 2021. Governor Greg Abbott has announced three special legislative sessions during summer 2021.

All seats in the state house and 16 seats in the state senate were up for election in November 2020. The Republican Party preserved their majority in both chambers.

Major events
 March 4, 2020 – present: COVID-19 pandemic in Texas.
 January 12, 2021: Legislature convened at noon (CST).
 February 10, 2021 – February 27, 2021: 2021 Texas power crisis.
 March 2, 2021: Greg Abbott announced the reopening of Texas businesses after nearly a year of various shutdowns and restrictions to quell the spread of COVID-19.
 May 30, 2021: House Democrats broke quorum, first time since 2003.
 May 31, 2021: Legislature adjourns.
 June 30, 2021: Greg Abbott announced he will convene a special legislative session on July 8.
 July 8, 2021: 87th Legislature 1st Called Session convened at 10:00 a.m. (CST).
 July 12, 2021: House Democrats fled to Washington, D.C., to break quorum, when the house convenes for the following day.
 July 13, 2021: The House lacks quorum. Will Metcalf (R) moved for a call of the house, which later passed.
 July 15, 2021: House Speaker Dade Phelan stripped Joe Moody from the Speaker Pro Tempore leadership position as house democrats continue to break quorum.
 August 5, 2021: Governor Abbott announced he will convene a second special legislative session on August 7.
 August 6, 2021: Legislature adjourns 1st special session.
 August 7, 2021: 87th Legislature 2nd Called Session convened at 12:00 p.m. (CST). The House continues to lack quorum, as several Democrats are still in Washington, D.C..
 August 19, 2021: Texas House makes quorum with 99 representatives present.
 September 2, 2021: Legislature adjourns 2nd special session.
 September 20, 2021: 87th Legislature 3rd Called Session convened at 10:00 a.m. (CST).
 October 19, 2021: Legislature adjourns 3rd special session.

Major legislation

Enacted
 House bills
 HB 5: The measure would aim to incentivize the expansion of broadband internet access to areas across the state through the creation of the State Broadband Development Office. The office would award grants, low-interest loans and other incentives to build out broadband access.
 HB 20: Prohibits large social media platform censorship of Texans.
 HB 1239: The measure would ban public officials from closing churches or other places of worship during a disaster declaration.
 HB 1280: The measure would ban abortion in Texas if Roe v. Wade were overturned by the Supreme Court of the United States.
 HB 1927 (Constitutional carry): The measure would allow people to carry handguns in Texas without a concealed handgun license.
 HB 3979: The bill would ban the teaching of critical race theory in Texas schools and limit what public school students can be taught about the United States’ history of subjugating people of color.

 Senate bills
 SB 1: Tightens the state's election laws and constrains local control of elections by limiting counties’ ability to expand voting options.
 TX SB3: An Act relating to certain curriculum in public schools, including certain instructional requirements and prohibitions
 SB 3: The legislation would create a statewide emergency system to alert Texans if power outages are expected and require power generation companies to better prepare their facilities to withstand extreme weather.
 SB 4: The bill would require any professional sports teams with contracts with the state government to play the national anthem before the start of a game.
 SB 8: Texas Heartbeat Act (nicknamed "Fetal Heartbeat bill"): The measure allows private citizens to sue people who perpetrate or aid and abet abortions after a fetal heartbeat is detected. It bans the procedure at about six weeks into a pregnancy, except to save the mother's life.

Proposed (but not enacted)
 House bills
 HB 3: The measure would give lawmakers more oversight of the governor's emergency powers during a pandemic and carves out future pandemics from how the state responds to other disasters, like hurricanes.
 HB 20: The legislation would keep more people accused or previously convicted of violent crimes in jail before trial unless they can post cash bonds.
 Senate bills
 SB 7: A change on the state election process; election integrity and security, including by preventing fraud in the conduct of elections in this state; increasing criminal penalties; creating criminal offenses.
 SB 10: The bill would ban local governments from using taxpayer dollars to lobby the state.
 SB 12: The bill would prohibit social media companies with at least 100 million monthly users from blocking, banning, demonetizing or discriminating against users based on their viewpoint or their location within the state.
 SB 29: The bill would prevent transgender Texas children from joining school sports teams that match their gender identity.
 SB 1311: The measure would prohibit health care providers and physicians from performing gender-confirmation surgery or prescribing, administering or supplying puberty blockers or hormone treatment to anyone younger than 18.
 SB 1529: The measure would create a new statewide court of appeals that would hear cases that have statewide significance — including ones that challenge state laws or the Constitution, or when the state or its agencies are sued.

Major resolutions adopted
 SR 2: Reduced the supermajority usually needed to bring up a bill in the Senate to 18 out of 31 (previously it was set at 19).

Party summary

Senate

Leadership 
President of the Senate: Dan Patrick (R)
President Pro Tempore: 
 Brian Birdwell (R) (Regular session, January 12 - May 31)
 Donna Campbell (R) (1st Called Session, July 8 - )

Members 

District 1: Bryan Hughes (R)
District 2: Bob Hall (R)
District 3: Robert Nichols (R)
District 4: Brandon Creighton (R)
District 5: Charles Schwertner (R)
District 6: Carol Alvarado (D)
District 7: Paul Bettencourt (R)
District 8: Angela Paxton (R)
District 9: Kelly Hancock (R)
District 10: Beverly Powell (D)
District 11: Larry Taylor (R)
District 12: Jane Nelson (R)
District 13: Borris Miles (D)
District 14: Sarah Eckhardt (D)
District 15: John Whitmire (D)
District 16: Nathan Johnson (D)
District 17: Joan Huffman (R)
District 18: Lois Kolkhorst (R)
District 19: Roland Gutierrez (D)
District 20: Juan Hinojosa (D)
District 21: Judith Zaffirini (D)
District 22: Brian Birdwell (R)
District 23: Royce West (D)
District 24: Dawn Buckingham (R)
District 25: Donna Campbell (R)
District 26: Jose Menendez (D)
District 27: Eddie Lucio Jr. (D)
District 28: Charles Perry (R)
District 29: Cesar Blanco (D)
District 30: Drew Springer (R)
District 31: Kel Seliger (R)

House of Representatives

Leadership 
Speaker of the House: Dade Phelan (R)
Speaker Pro Tempore:
 Joe Moody (D) (January 12 - July 15)
 TBD

Members 

District 1: Gary VanDeaver (R)
District 2: Bryan Slaton (R)
District 3: Cecil Bell Jr. (R)
District 4: Keith Bell (R)
District 5: Cole Hefner (R)
District 6: Matt Schaefer (R)
District 7: Jay Dean (R)
District 8: Cody Harris (R)
District 9: Chris Paddie (R)
District 10: 
 * Jake Ellzey (R), until July 30, 2021
 * Brian Harrison, from October 12, 2021
District 11: Travis Clardy (R)
District 12: Kyle Kacal (R)
District 13: Ben Leman (R)
District 14: John Raney (R)
District 15: Steve Toth (R)
District 16: Will Metcalf (R)
District 17: John Cyrier (R)
District 18: Ernest Bailes (R)
District 19: James White (R)
District 20: Terry Wilson (R)
District 21: Dade Phelan (R)
District 22: Joe Deshotel (D)
District 23: Mayes Middleton (R)
District 24: Greg Bonnen (R)
District 25: Cody Vasut (R)
District 26: Jacey Jetton (R)
District 27: Ron Reynolds (D)
District 28: Gary Gates (R)
District 29: Edward Thompson (R)
District 30: Geanie Morrison (R)
District 31: Ryan Guillen (D, then R)
District 32: Todd Hunter (R)
District 33: Justin Holland (R)
District 34: Abel Herrero (D)
District 35: Oscar Longoria (D)
District 36: Sergio Muñoz (D)
District 37: Alex Dominguez (D)
District 38: Eddie Lucio III (D)
 * Eddie Lucio III (D), until January 31, 2022
 * Erin Gamez, from March 15, 2022
District 39: Armando Martinez (D)
District 40: Terry Canales (D)
District 41: Robert Guerra (D)
District 42: Richard Raymond (D)
District 43: J. M. Lozano (R)
District 44: John Kuempel (R)
District 45: Erin Zwiener (D)
District 46: Sheryl Cole (D)
District 47: Vikki Goodwin (D)
District 48: Donna Howard (D)
District 49: Gina Hinojosa (D)
District 50: Celia Israel (D)
District 51: Eddie Rodriguez (D)
District 52: James Talarico (D)
District 53: Andrew Murr (R)
District 54: Brad Buckley (R)
District 55: Hugh Shine (R)
District 56: Charles Anderson (R)
District 57: Trent Ashby (R)
District 58: DeWayne Burns (R)
District 59: Shelby Slawson (R)
District 60: Glenn Rogers (R)
District 61: Phil King (R)
District 62: Reggie Smith (R)
District 63: Tan Parker (R)
District 64: Lynn Stucky (R)
District 65: Michelle Beckley (D)
District 66: Matt Shaheen (R)
District 67: Jeff Leach (R)
District 68: David Spiller (R), from March 9, 2021
District 69: James Frank (R)
District 70: Scott Sanford (R)
District 71: Stan Lambert (R)
District 72: Drew Darby (R)
District 73: Kyle Biedermann (R)
District 74: Eddie Morales (D)
District 75: Mary González (D)
District 76: Claudia Ordaz Perez (D)
District 77: Lina Ortega (D)
District 78: Joe Moody (D)
District 79: Art Fierro (D)
District 80: Tracy King (D)
District 81: Brooks Landgraf (R)
District 82: Tom Craddick (R)
District 83: Dustin Burrows (R)
District 84: John Frullo (R)
District 85: Phil Stephenson (R)
District 86: John Smithee (R)
District 87: Four Price (R)
District 88: Ken King (R)
District 89: Candy Noble (R)
District 90: Ramon Romero Jr. (D)
District 91: Stephanie Klick (R)
District 92: Jeff Cason (R)
District 93: Matt Krause (R)
District 94: Tony Tinderholt (R)
District 95: Nicole Collier (D)
District 96: David Cook (R)
District 97: Craig Goldman (R)
District 98: Giovanni Capriglione (R)
District 99: Charlie Geren (R)
District 100: Jasmine Crockett (D)
District 101: Chris Turner (D)
District 102: Ana-Maria Ramos (D)
District 103: Rafael Anchia (D)
District 104: Jessica González (D)
District 105: Terry Meza (D)
District 106: Jared Patterson (R)
District 107: Victoria Neave (D)
District 108: Morgan Meyer (R)
District 109: Carl Sherman (D)
District 110: Toni Rose (D)
District 111: Yvonne Davis (D)
District 112: Angie Button (R)
District 113: Rhetta Bowers (D)
District 114: John Turner (D)
District 115: Julie Johnson (D)
District 116: Trey Martinez Fischer (D)
District 117: Philip Cortez (D)
District 118: Leo Pacheco (D), until August 19, 2021
 * John Lujan, from November 16, 2021
District 119: Elizabeth Campos (D)
District 120: Barbara Gervin-Hawkins (D)
District 121: Steve Allison (R)
District 122: Lyle Larson (R)
District 123: Diego Bernal (D)
District 124: Ina Minjarez (D)
District 125: Ray Lopez (D)
District 126: Sam Harless (R)
District 127: Dan Huberty (R)
District 128: Briscoe Cain (R)
District 129: Dennis Paul (R)
District 130: Tom Oliverson (R)
District 131: Alma Allen (D)
District 132: Mike Schofield (R)
District 133: Jim Murphy (R)
District 134: Ann Johnson (D)
District 135: Jon Rosenthal (D)
District 136: John Bucy III (D)
District 137: Gene Wu (D)
District 138: Lacey Hull (R)
District 139: Jarvis Johnson (D)
District 140: Armando Walle (D)
District 141: Senfronia Thompson (D)
District 142: Harold Dutton Jr. (D)
District 143: Ana Hernandez (D)
District 144: Mary Ann Perez (D)
District 145: Christina Morales (D)
District 146: Shawn Thierry (D)
District 147: 
 * Garnet Coleman (D), until February 28, 2022
 * Jolanda Jones (D), from May 18, 2022
District 148: Penny Morales Shaw (D)
District 149: Hubert Vo (D)
District 150: Valoree Swanson (R)

Changes in membership

House of Representatives

Committees 
Listed by chamber and then alphabetically by committee name, including chair and vice-chair.

Senate

House

Notes

References

External links 

87 Texas Legislature
2021 in Texas
Texas